James A. Eliopulos (born April 18, 1959) is a former American football linebacker in the National Football League (NFL) for the Dallas Cowboys, St. Louis Cardinals and New York Jets. He played college football at the University of Wyoming.

Early years
Eliopulos attended Cheyenne Central High School, where he lettered in football, basketball, baseball and track. He was named Wyoming's high school athlete of the year as a senior.

He enrolled at Westminster College, before transferring to the University of Wyoming after his sophomore season. 

As a junior, he started at linebacker after having played different positions (including tight end) in previous years, finishing with 83 tackles, 2 interceptions, 2 forced fumbles and 4 sacks.

In 1981, he posted 84 tackles (led the team), 2 interceptions, 3 fumble recoveries and a then school record 10 sacks. His best game was against Colorado State University when he made 10 tackles, 6 sacks for 54 yards in losses and one interception, earning him WAC player of the week honors.

Professional career

Dallas Cowboys
Eliopulos was selected in the third round (81st overall) of the 1982 NFL Draft by the Dallas Cowboys, who liked his potential as an athlete. He injured his knee during the first week of training camp and was placed on the injured reserve list on September 6. He was released on August 22, 1983.

St. Louis Cardinals
On August 25, 1983, he was claimed off waivers by the St. Louis Cardinals, but was released after playing in 4 games.

New York Jets
In 1983, he signed with the New York Jets as a free agent. He spent 3 seasons as a backup, playing mainly on special teams. In 1985, he was cut on 3 different occasions.

Toronto Argonauts (CFL)
In 1987, he was signed by the Toronto Argonauts of the Canadian Football League. He was released on June 3.

References

1959 births
Living people
People from Cheyenne, Wyoming
Players of American football from Wyoming
Cheyenne Central High School alumni
American football linebackers
Westminster Parsons football players
Wyoming Cowboys football players
Dallas Cowboys players
St. Louis Cardinals (football) players
New York Jets players
Toronto Argonauts players
American people of Greek descent